Charmian Penelope Gooch (born 1965) is a British anti-corruption campaigner and activist. She is a co-founder and board member of the NGO Global Witness, where she works to uncover and fight corruption in the developing world.

Gooch's career spans over 23 years and has focused on a variety of global issues such as revealing suspect oil and mineral deals and investigating business in various corrupt regimes. Together with Global Witness, she takes charge of campaigns and investigations that lead to the prevention of "conflict and corruption over natural resources and associated environmental and human rights abuses." These have included the war on blood diamonds, the depletion of natural resources, illegal and industrial-scale logging, and revenue transparency.

Gooch's involvement with Global Witness has earned her and the organisation a variety of awards and nominations.

Early life 
Born in 1965, Gooch is a self-confessed "lifelong troublemaker." She grew up in London and was taught by her parents to question authority. She has had an interest in environmental issues ever since she was a child, which carried on into her later years as a university graduate.

In 1987, Gooch graduated from the University of Wales, Aberystwyth, where she studied history and immediately pursued to look for a job after graduation. Gooch's first professional position was as a researcher at the Environmental Investigation Agency (EIA), a non-governmental organisation that was based out of London and focused on exposing polluters and poachers. It was a branch of Greenpeace that "conducted undercover investigations into environmental crime." At 22 years of age, Gooch participated in the investigation of the illegal trade in African ivory.

This first foray into the field of uncovering and fighting global atrocities introduced Gooch to various undercover investigation techniques used to address concerning international wildlife trades (for example, whaling and ivory) and other environmental issues. These early experiences also helped her discover a passion for addressing the plundering of natural resources, and a corrupt system of "loopholes and money laundering" that makes these efforts difficult to effectively police. Investigations regarding black markets dealing with ivory in the Middle East and Hong Kong also helped her learn about corporate structures and how money moves around.

Gooch's experience with the EIA introduced her to the general world of corruption and thus, the creation of Global Witness.

Global Witness 
Global Witness is a British non-governmental organisation based out of London, England. With the financial backing of hedge-fund billionaire George Soros, the organisation fulfills a watchdog function, and has led a variety of campaigns and investigations aimed at uncovering a global architecture of conflict and corruption, that some have suggested is "woven into" the business of extracting and exploiting natural resources.

Deploying various tactics, including undercover investigations and aggressive forms of lobbying, Gooch and Global Witness fight numerous instances of corruption. More specifically, they fight instances of corruption in which "money earned from a country's natural resources are diverted away from its rightful owners, the country's citizens."   

Global Witness's research and campaigning has made the organisation a "leading global voice on what can be done to stamp out the abuse of anonymous companies." Using extensive knowledge on how shady businesses and governments inter-operate with each other, Gooch and Global Witness have unveiled various sources of corruption and exploitation and continue to do so.

Early years 
Gooch met her colleagues and future Global Witness co-founders Simon Taylor and Patrick Alley while they were working together at the Environmental Investigation Agency. Concerns over the funding of covert warfare through illegal trade had increased at the time. After discussing the need for a campaign group that could address these and related environmental and human rights issues, the trio decided to take action.  

Gooch co-founded Global Witness in 1993 with Taylor and Alley to expose the "nexus of corruption, natural resources, and conflict". They created Global Witness due to the "looting of entire countries," which they saw as a human rights issue.

At its inception, Gooch and her co-founders solicited donations at London Underground station entrances due to a lack of funding sources. Eventually, a Dutch charity known as Oxfam Novib provided the trio with enough money to start their first major campaign on the Cambodia-Thailand frontier. This also became a starting point for them to "build their activism on facts they collected themselves in the field."

Khmer Rouge timber trade 
In January and February 1995, Gooch and Global Witness undertook an investigation regarding the illegal trade of timber in both Thailand and Cambodia, which was largely responsible for funding the civil war in Cambodia. Posing as timber buyers, Gooch and her team visited logging camps to study how a Cambodian communist insurgency known as the Khmer Rouge was "collaborating with Thai interests to cut down hardwood forests in violation of a United Nations ban."

One night, while undercover at a Khmer Rouge checkpoint with her colleague Patrick Alley, a local guard stopped Gooch and her co-worker while they were travelling in a car. The guard was intoxicated and proceeded to lean into the car with an AK-47 before the pair decided to tell the driver to "Go! Go!"

The evidence Gooch and Global Witness managed to obtain was compiled into a report called Forest, Famine, and War – The Key to Cambodia's Future, which was published in March 1995. Subsequently, the report received widespread press coverage around the world and was widely distributed among delegates of donor countries to Cambodia, as well as various non-governmental organisations and multi-lateral donor agencies. The international pressure that followed as a result of the report forced Cambodia to introduce a timber export ban in May 1995 that significantly reduced Thai trading with the Khmer Rouge and effectively closed the Cambodian border to further Thai timber imports.

The Khmer Rouge and their leader were deprived of an annual revenue close to $90 million. In the 13 months that followed, the Khmer Rouge located near the Cambodia-Thailand border eventually defected to the government, as Global Witness had effectively "cut off their income."

Blood Diamond trade 
In the late 1990s, the sale of diamonds to fund wars in countries such as Angola, Liberia, the Democratic Republic of Congo, and Sierra Leone had resulted in the death and displacement of millions of people. 

In 1997, Gooch travelled to Angola to investigate how militants were mining diamonds to prolong a civil war that had started in the 1970s. She shoved a would-be-mugger down a flight of stairs while gathering information about the diamond supply chain from government officials and businessmen in the Angolan capital of Luanda and in the diamond-trading centre of Antwerp, Belgium, earning her a reputation for toughness.  

With her Global Witness co-founders Taylor and Alley, Gooch proceeded to travel to Lisbon to interview members of an Angolan anti-communist group called the National Union for the Total Independence of Angola. Also known as UNITA, Gooch and her colleagues probed into questions regarding mining operations in Angola.     

Gooch and Global Witness compiled all of the evidence they had collected into a report entitled "A Rough Trade," which was published and released in 1998. Exposing the role of diamonds in funding the civil war in Angola, the report also revealed the secretive practices of the global diamond industry for the first time. It illustrated how over a six-year period, UNITA was able to purchase arms by generating $3.7 billion from the sale of diamonds. This prompted governments and other entities in the diamond industry to take action to remove "conflict diamonds" from the global marketplace.

Gooch's efforts helped Global Witness become the first organisation to bring the world's attention to the issue of conflict diamonds. As a result of their findings, a government-led certification scheme known as the Kimberley Process was set up in 2003 in an effort to reduce the trade of conflict diamonds. It requires member states to "set up an import and export control system" in which rough diamonds are tracked from the mines to the jewellers.

Gooch's work with Global Witness in exposing the conflict diamond trade was the inspiration for the 2006 film Blood Diamond. The film highlights some of the key events that Global Witness was a part of, such as the 1998 report and the creation of the Kimberley Process.

Anonymous companies 
In most corruption cases that Global Witness has pursued, Gooch and her colleagues have found one aspect that is very common. They discovered that most perpetrators stored their money in "daisy chains of untraceable shell companies," which are corporate entities that are minuscule in size and located in offshore havens such as the British Virgin Islands. This was creating a financial system that made it simple to "hide and move suspect funds around the world" while impacting "hundreds of millions of people in countries all over the world."

To address this challenge, in 2010 Gooch and Global Witness began work with a coalition of non-governmental organisations committed to forcing companies to identify "their ultimate, or beneficial, owners." The coalition has engaged in lobbying of policymakers in Washington, London, and Brussels, calling for "governments to create public registries of the real owners of companies and trusts so that law enforcement, businesses, NGOs, and ordinary citizens know who they're dealing with."

Efforts by Gooch and her allies aimed at encouraging members of the G8 to be more transparent were successful when the US Congress passed a piece of legislation in July 2010 known as the Dodd – Frank Wall Street Reform and Consumer Protection Act, which was designed to decrease various risks in the US financial system.

In 2013, Gooch's movement progressed further when the UK government made the issue of anonymous companies the central focus of its G8 presidency and committed to "ending anonymous companies by publishing information on the ultimate, beneficial owners of British companies." On 31 October, UK Prime Minister at the time David Cameron attended the Open Government Partnership conference in London and took to the stage to announce that he was going to "introduce legislation requiring all companies based in Britain to disclose who their ultimate owners are in a publicly accessible registry."

In 2014, Gooch's lobbying for eliminating anonymous companies resulted in two key committees of the European Parliament voting to do the same. The European Union agreed to create public registries detailing who owns and controls companies and trusts registered in the EU.

Her work also led to the creation of a report called "The Great Rip Off," published in September of the same year and aimed at illustrating how anonymous company owners in the US are a "threat to American interests." As a result of the report, Gooch garnered support for her campaign from law enforcement officials and business leaders worldwide.

Other ventures 
In 2001, Gooch and Global Witness investigated a logging deal between the Zimbabwean Forestry Commission and the DRC government. Their work revealed that the deal had ties to the Zimbabwe African National Union – Patriotic Front and would result in the destruction of a forest area comparable to the size of the UK As a result of their investigation, the deal was immediately halted.

In 2003, they worked with the LA Times to reveal that Riggs Bank in Washington, DC held millions of dollars worth of oil revenues for Equatorial Guinea's president Teodoro Obiang. The subsequent investigation performed by a Senate committee found the bank was indeed engaging in money-laundering, resulting in a fine of $25 million as well as the eventual selling off of the company "at a fraction of its value."

In 2005, Gooch and Global Witness discovered that China had been importing up to "1.3 million cubic meters of timber from Burma per year and that around 98% of this trade was illegal." The evidence published in the consequent Global Witness report generated an international outcry that prompted the Chinese government to "close its land border to timber from Burma in early 2006."

Awards and nominations 
Gooch's work and involvement with Global Witness has resulted in awards and nominations for both her and the organisation.

Gooch and Global Witness's campaign to combat blood diamonds that started in 1997 subsequently led to their nomination for the 2003 Nobel Peace Prize. The award that year was awarded to Iranian human rights activist Shirin Ebadi.

In 2005, Gooch and her Global Witness co-founders Patrick Alley and Simon Taylor received the Gleitsman International Activist Award from the Harvard Kennedy School. The award was created in 1993 by Alan Greitsman to "honor leadership in social activism that has improved the quality of life in countries and inspired others to do the same." Gooch and her colleagues were honorees of the award along with Han Dongfang, international advocate of the worker's movement in China. They received $125,000 and a "specially commissioned sculpture designed by Maya Lin, the creator of the Vietnam War Memorial."

In 2014, Gooch and her Global Witness co-founders Alley and Taylor received the Skoll Award for Social Entrepreneurship from the Skoll Foundation because of their "quest to expose corruption, conflict, and environmental degradation," which involves putting an end to the "resource course that has kept millions of the world's poorest people in poverty." The award consists of $1.25 million and is given to "transformative leaders who are disrupting the status quo, driving large-scale change, and are poised to make an even greater impact on the world."

She was named in the Bloomberg Markets "50 Most Influential" list alongside other honorees such as Apple CEO Tim Cook, billionaire philanthropist Warren Buffett and Chancellor George Osborne.

She was also named by Fast Company as one of the 100 most creative people in business for "shining a light on corporate secrecy." She came in at number 38.

In the same year, Gooch was presented with the TED Prize for her campaign to end anonymous companies, which is awarded to an "exceptional individual with a creative and bold vision to spark global change." It includes $1 million in prize money and the resources of the TED community. She stated that she will use the award money to "make it impossible for criminals and corrupt dictators to hide behind anonymous companies." Her TED Prize wish was to "know who owns and controls companies so that they can no longer be used anonymously against the public good" and to "ignite world opinion, change the law, and together launch a new era of openness in business."

Legacy, influence, and future 
Gooch's work with Global Witness has impacted various parts of the world in different ways. Her investigation into the timber trade between the Khmer Rouge and Cambodia deprived the Khmer Rouge leader at the time Pol Pot of approximately $90 million a year, leading to the defection of the Khmer Rouge located near the Thailand-Cambodia border and to their eventual downfall. The Cambodia border was also closed to further Thai timber imports, significantly reducing the amount of illegal trade occurring at the time.

Her work with Global Witness in the late 1990s exposed how the blood diamond trade was responsible for funding wars and conflicts around the world. It led to the creation of a report in 1998 called "A Rough Trade," which exposed the "illegal export from war-torn African countries of diamonds that bankrolled rebel groups notorious for mass rape and cutting off hands." By uncovering the role that companies and governments played in the trade, Gooch and Global Witness were influential in establishing the Kimberley Process Certification Scheme in 2003, which is an international agreement designed to prevent the trade of conflict diamonds by tracking diamonds from the mines to the jewellers. The 2006 film Blood Diamond was based partly off Gooch's work.

Gooch's work in dealing with anonymous companies led to changes in legislation that allowed for the proper identification of company owners. As a result, two-thirds of worldwide oil, gas, and mining revenues are covered by transparency laws. In 2010, the US passed the Dodd – Frank Wall Street Reform and Consumer Protection Act, which allowed for greater transparency in regards to US company owners. In 2013, the UK government committed to ending anonymity by making information available about the beneficiaries and owners of British organisations in a register open to the public. The European Union also followed in the same manner as the British government and voted in favour of having public registries.

Gooch's methodology with Global Witness involves "gathering detailed, first-hand evidence of the problem, seeking to name and shame those responsible for mismanagement and misappropriation of revenues from natural resources, telling everyone about it in comprehensive reports meticulously checked by teams of lawyers, then following up with relentless lobbying for long-term solutions." They differ themselves from other non-governmental organisations by avoiding typical NGO characteristics such as doing demos, having a membership base, and actively fundraising from the public. Apart from being investigators, they also act as lobbyists, briefing policy makers, and the media to make sure that all members are familiar with the events that are occurring.

Her vision for Global Witness is to "keep making change happen." She wants the organisation to become better at investigating, analysing, and campaigning. She wants to be able to uncover and expose more illegal activities that are taking place globally. Gooch also wants to be able to campaign tirelessly to "change the system so it can no longer prop up conflict, corruption, and environmental destruction." She has stated that the secret to her leadership has been focusing on and pursuing an idea that someone else would otherwise think is "ludicrous."

References

External links 
 Global Witness website
 Global Witness Twitter page
 Charmian Gooch Twitter page

1965 births
Living people
British anti-corruption activists
Alumni of Aberystwyth University
People from London